Luca Pesando (born 20 April 1966) is an Italian former alpine skier.

World Cup results
Top 15

References

External links
 

1966 births
Living people
Italian male alpine skiers
Sportspeople from Aosta Valley
Alpine skiers of Centro Sportivo Carabinieri
People from Bardonecchia
Sportspeople from the Metropolitan City of Turin
Italian alpine skiing coaches